Fomento, or Playa Fomento, is a resort village on the coast of Río de la Plata in the Colonia Department of Uruguay.

Geography
It borders Playa Parant to the west and further west are Playa Britópolis and Blanca Arena, while Santa Regina lies to its east. All these resorts are situated along the same sandy beach.

Population
In 2004, Fomento had a population of 84 permanent inhabitants and 177 dwellings. In spite of its low population number, it has many houses that are used during summer.
 
Source: Instituto Nacional de Estadística de Uruguay

Places of interest
 Parque 17 de Febrero (17 February Park), belonging to the Waldensian Evangelical Church.

References

External links 
INE map of Playa Britopolis, Playa Azul, Playa Parant, Playa Foment and Los Pinos

Populated places in the Colonia Department
Seaside resorts in Uruguay